Clickimin Loch is a loch in Shetland, Scotland, west of Lerwick. A Pictish fort from the 6th century called Clickimin Broch is located on a small islet at the southern end of the loch.

Clickimin Leisure Centre is at the north of the loch.

References

Lochs of Shetland
Lerwick